Virtuosity is a 1995 American science fiction action film directed by Brett Leonard and starring Denzel Washington and Russell Crowe. Howard W. Koch Jr. served as an executive producer for the film. The film was released in the United States on August 4, 1995. Virtuosity had an estimated budget of $30 million and grossed $37 million worldwide.

Plot
In Los Angeles, Lt. Parker Barnes and John Donovan are testing a virtual reality system that is going to be used for training police officers. The two are tracking down a serial killer named SID 6.7 at a restaurant in virtual reality. SID (short for Sadistic, Intelligent, Dangerous, a VR amalgam of the most violent serial killers throughout history) causes Donovan to go into shock, killing him. The director overseeing the project, before Commissioner Elizabeth Deane and her associate, William Wallace, orders the programmer in charge of creating SID, Dr. Darrel Lindenmeyer, to shut down the project. Barnes is a former police officer imprisoned for killing political terrorist Matthew Grimes, who killed Parker's wife and daughter. Barnes killed Grimes but also accidentally shot two news reporters in the process. This caused him to become a convicted killer and serve 17 years to life.

Barnes meets with criminal psychologist Dr. Madison Carter following a fight between Barnes and another prisoner, Big Red. Meanwhile, Lindenmeyer informs SID that he is about to be shut down because the death was caused when he disabled the fail-safes. At SID's suggestion, Lindenmeyer convinces another employee, Clyde Reilly, that a sexually-compliant virtual reality model, Sheila 3.2, another project created by Lindenmeyer, can be brought to life in a synthetically grown android body. Lindenmeyer replaces the Sheila 3.2 module with the SID 6.7 module. Now processed into the real world, SID 6.7 kills Reilly.

Once word gets out of SID being in the real world, Deane and Los Angeles Police Department Chief William Cochran offer Barnes a deal: if he catches SID and brings him back to virtual reality, he will be pardoned. Barnes agrees, and with help from Carter, they discover that Matthew Grimes, the terrorist who killed Barnes's wife and daughter, is a part of SID 6.7's personality profile. After killing a family along with a group of security guards, SID heads over to the Media Zone, a local nightclub, where he takes hostages. Barnes and Carter go to the nightclub to stop him, but SID escapes.

The next day, SID begins a killing spree at the Los Angeles Olympic Auditorium. Barnes arrives at the Stadium to capture SID, and finds him on a train, where another hostage is being held by SID. However, Barnes seemingly kills the hostage in front of horrified witnesses. Having caught up with Barnes after the incident, Carter tries to prove Barnes's innocence, but Barnes is sent back to prison. Barnes is freed from his prisoner transport by SID, who once again escapes. Wallace and Deane are about to have Barnes terminated via a fail-safe transmitter implanted in him  but Cochran destroys the system after learning from Carter that Barnes didn't kill the hostage on the train.

However, SID kidnaps Carter's daughter Karin and takes over a television studio. Lindenmeyer, having come out of hiding, sees what SID is doing and is impressed, but is captured by Carter. After a fight on the roof of the studio Barnes ultimately destroys SID's body, but is unable to learn where he hid Karin. They place SID back in VR to trick the location out of him which proves to be one of the fan enclosures on the studio roof. When SID discovers that he is back in virtual reality he goes into a rage. Cochran lets Carter out of VR, but Lindenmeyer kills Cochran before he can release Barnes. Barnes starts to go into the same shock that Donovan suffered, but Carter kills Lindenmeyer, and saves Barnes.

Barnes and Carter return to the building that SID took over in the real world, and save Karin from a booby trap set up by SID that's similar to the one that killed Barnes' family. After Karin is saved, Barnes destroys the SID 6.7 module.

Cast
 Denzel Washington as Lieutenant Parker Barnes, who was imprisoned after killing a man who killed his family
 Russell Crowe as SID 6.7, a virtual reality entity who later becomes a regenerating android
 Kelly Lynch as Dr. Madison Carter, a criminal psychologist who teams with Barnes to understand SID's behavior
 Stephen Spinella as Dr. Darrel Lindenmeyer, who created SID 6.7 and Sheila 3.2
 William Forsythe as Chief Billy Cochran
 Louise Fletcher as Commissioner Elizabeth Deane
 William Fichtner as William Wallace
 Costas Mandylor as John Donovan
 Kevin J. O'Connor as Clyde Reilly
 Kaley Cuoco as Karin Carter, Madison's daughter
 Christopher Murray as Matthew Grimes
 Mari Morrow as Linda Barnes
 Johnny Kim as Lab Tech
 Heidi Schanz as Sheila 3.2
 Traci Lords as Media Zone singer
 Gordon Jennison Noice as 'Big Red'
 Michael Buffer as Emcee

Production
Washington restructured much of the story and dialogue during filming, entirely removing a romantic subtext between the Lt. Barnes and Dr. Carter characters from the original script.

Principal photography for the film began on January 25, 1995. Parts of the film were filmed at the abandoned Hughes Aircraft plant in Los Angeles.

Music

The soundtrack was released on MCA imprint Radioactive Records and contained music from Peter Gabriel, Talking Heads, Tricky and Live, among others.

An album containing the complete score by Christopher Young was released on July 26, 2019 on Intrada Records. A promo CD had previously been released. Producer Gary Lucchesi hired Young after working with him previously on Jennifer 8. Much of Young's score is electronic-influenced while the last third of the film utilizes an orchestra.

Reception

Critical response
The film received mostly mixed to negative reviews. It has a rotten score of 32% on Rotten Tomatoes based on 34 reviews, with 32% of the audience indicating they liked it. The site's consensus states: "Woefully deficient in thrills or common sense, Virtuosity strands its talented stars in a story whose vision of the future is depressingly short on imagination." It also has a score of 39 out of 100 on Metacritic based on 17 reviews. Roger Ebert, however, wrote that the movie was "filled with bright ideas and fresh thinking" and "still finds surprises" despite a somewhat clichéd premise.

The film was nominated for Best Picture at the Sitges Film Festival, losing to Citizen X.

Box office
The film grossed $24 million in the United States and Canada and $37 million worldwide.

Novelization
In 1995, a novelization of the film by author Terry Bisson was published by Pocket.

See also
 American Gangster, 2007 film starring Washington and Crowe in switched antagonist/protagonist roles
 Simulated reality

References

External links

 
 
 

1995 films
1990s chase films
1990s science fiction action films
American chase films
American science fiction action films
1990s English-language films
Films about computing
Films about telepresence
Films about virtual reality
Films directed by Brett Leonard
Films produced by Gary Lucchesi
Films scored by Christopher Young
Films set in 1999
Films set in California
Films set in Los Angeles
American police detective films
Paramount Pictures films
1990s American films
1995 science fiction films